The Voice of Vietnam or VOV (also Radio the Voice of Vietnam, Vietnamese: Đài Tiếng nói Việt Nam) is the Vietnamese national radio broadcaster.  Directly controlled by the government of Vietnam, it is tasked with propagating the policies of the Party and the laws of the state.

History 

Prior to 1945, the Vietnamese were banned from owning radio receivers, and broadcasting was under control of the French colonial government, which established the first radio station in Vietnam, Radio Saigon, in the late 1920s.

Vietnam's national radio station, now called the Voice of Vietnam, started broadcasting from Dalat just a week after the declaration of the Democratic Republic of Vietnam with the declaration "This is the Voice of Vietnam, broadcasting from Hanoi, the capital of the Democratic Republic of Vietnam."  During the Vietnam War, Radio Hanoi operated as a propaganda tool of North Vietnam. In August 1968, Voice of Vietnam commenced shortwave broadcasts for Vietnamese living abroad.

South Vietnam set up its own network in Saigon in 1955 from the roots of the ex-State of Vietnam's station, named as Radio Vietnam. Meanwhile, in 1962, the NLFSVN established their own radio station, named Liberation Radio Station.

Following Reunification, all of the radio stations were combined into the Voice of Vietnam, which became the national radio station in 1978.

In 1990, VOV launched the first FM station of the network, with the original frequency at 100.0 MHz. At first, this station was dedicated to music, entertainment and information program. It later become the flagship frequency of the news and generalist station (VOV1), whereas the music content was transferred into the FM frequency of 102.7 MHz - which is the music station VOV3 at present.

The Vietnamese-language program for Vietnamese diaspora was first transmitted on 16 August 1991 on longwaves and shortwaves, following the foreign language programs since the founding of the radio network's external service. At the same year, the socio-culture oriented station VOV2 was established.

In 1998, Radio the Voice of Vietnam published its first daily newspaper, named Voice of Vietnam. At the same time, the first FM radio channel for the foreign community in Vietnam, operated-and-owned by VOV World Service, was inaugurated. The station transmitted at the frequency of FM 105.5 MHz in Hanoi and 105.7 MHz in Ho Chi Minh City. The following year (1999), VOV expanded its platform with the launching of the news webpage www.vovnews.vn (later www.vov.vn).

On 1 October 2004, VOV began transmitting VOV4, a radio station dedicated to minorities in Vietnam nationwide.

From 7 September 2008, to commemorate the 68th founding anniversary of the network, VOV launched their own television channel. Originally named Hệ phát thanh có hình (lit. Visualised Radio Station), it was renamed into Kênh Truyền hình Đài Tiếng nói Việt Nam or Kênh Truyền hình Tiếng nói Việt Nam (Voice of Vietnam Television Channel) in 2012 after the VOV was licensed to operating the television system.

From 18 May 2009, the VOV Transportation Network was established. First transmitting officially in Hanoi on 21 June 2009 with the frequency of FM 91.0 MHz, it was expanded into the South, first with Ho Chi Minh City on 2 January 2010 with the same frequency, then to Mekong Delta region on 25 June 2017 with the FM frequency 90.0 MHz.

From 2015 to 2018, VOV co-operated with the Office of the Vietnamese National Assembly to broadcast a television channel which aimed at Vietnamese political activities and relatable issues.

On 2 June 2015, Voice of Vietnam officially acquired the VTC Digital Television Network from the Ministry of Information and Communications. It was first owned by the Vietnam Multimedia Corporation from 2004 to 2013. At the same year, the English-language radio station VOV English 24/7 went on test broadcasting in 1 October, and officially commence on-air more than a month later at 6 November under the frequency of FM 104.0 MHz.

In 2016, VOV relaunched the 89.0 MHz FM station into a health-oriented station.

From 2017, VOV began operating the VOV Media app on smartphones, and in 2020, VOV launched VOV LIVE, a digital platform featuring live radio & TV channel with on-demand programs as well.

Services

Radio 

The VOV runs eight national domestic radio stations and one international service, four of which are only available on FM frequencies; one is running as a block on sister station; plus live streams and listen again on applications such as VOV LIVE and VOV Media.

The main radio stations available on analogue (FM, MW, SW) and VOV applications are:

 VOV1 – news and current affairs; plus live important national events, parliament meetings, etc. Music, literature and drama are the only fields that largely fall outside its format. Broadcast 20.5 hours a day, with overnight simulcast of VOV3 from midnight to 04:45 (excluding for analog radio will sign off during this time period). Available on 94-100 FM, 594-711 MW and 5.975-7.21 SW.
 VOV2 – culture, sports, leisure, science and educational. Broadcast 20.5 hours a day; available on 96.5-103.5 FM, 549-1089 MW and 6.02-9.875 SW.
 VOV3 – music-oriented. Broadcast 24 hours a day, with co-operative pop music timeslot in early morning (06:00 to 09:00), drivetime (17:00 to 22:00). Available on 102.7 FM in Hanoi, HCMC and nationwide FM systems.
 VOV4 – ethnic languages, broadcasting in 11 languages. Available in MW, SW and FM under five regional feed (Northwestern, Central, Central Highlands, Ho Chi Minh City, Mekong Delta), 12 hours a day.  All five feeds are available online and on VOV apps.
 VOV5 (also called VOV World) – international service. Broadcasting in 13 foreign languages to many parts of the world via analogue and digital shortwave, internet streaming and podcasting, satellite, FM and MW relays. The Vietnamese feed is available on 105.5 FM in Hanoi and 105.7 FM in Ho Chi Minh City from 07:00 to 23:00 (16 hours a day)
 VOV6 – literature and art programmes, a block on VOV2 with diversal air time.
 VOV Traffic Service – transportation information. Divided into three separate channels: VOV Traffic Service - Hanoi, VOV Traffic Service - Ho Chi Minh City and Mekong FM. The Hanoi and HCMC editions both available on 91.0 FM, whereas the Mekong edition is available on 90.0 FM. These channels are all broadcast 24 hours a day.
 VOV FM 89 MHz –  health, environment and safety consumering programmes, 17 hours a day. Houses Xone FM, a music-oriented programme block, airs during daytime (07:00 to 13:00) and drivetime (17:00 to 21:00). True to its name, this radio station is available on 89.0 FM in Hanoi, HCMC and several areas.
 VOV English 24/7 – English-language programmes, 18 hours a day. Available on 104.0 FM in Hanoi, Hue and HCMC.

Television 
 Television channel VOV TV 
 The network VTC Digital Television

Other media platforms 
 Voice of Vietnam: VOV's printing newspaper, first released on 2 November 1998. From 2012, the VOV newspaper format was switched to compact format; it was later reverse back to original Berliner format after a short time.
 VOV.VN: VOV's online site; first launched on 3 September 1999 under the name VOV NEWS
VOV Media: Multimedia applications, available on mobile

See also
 Media of Vietnam
List of radio stations in Vietnam

References

External links
 
  
 Voice of Vietnam 
 Vietnam Radio Stations Online; Full List Updated 2013

1945 establishments in Vietnam
International broadcasters
Government of Vietnam
Radio stations established in 1945
Radio stations in Vietnam